The Saurian Expedition of 1905 was a noted paleontological research mission in northern Nevada in the United States. The expedition recovered many of the finest specimens of ichthyosaur ever found.

The expedition was led by Eustace Furlong, an assistant at the Geology Department at Berkeley, under the guidance of Prof. John C. Merriam, of the University of California. The expedition was financed by Annie Montague Alexander, who four years earlier as a student in Berkeley had become interested in Merriam's work. Alexander was an active participant and collector during the expedition along with Edna Wemple, also a student of Merriam. 

The expedition examined Triassic limestones in the West Humboldt Range northeast of Reno, progressing into central Nevada south to the Shoshone Mountains. Some of the specimens were returned to Berkeley and became part of the collection of the University of California Museum of Paleontology, which Alexander helped found and underwrite.

References

External links
UCMP: The Saurian Expedition of 1905

History of paleontology
Natural history of Nevada
1905 in the United States
1905 in science
North American expeditions
Expeditions from the United States
Paleontology in Nevada
1905 in Nevada